The Ars Magna (The Great Art, 1545) is an important Latin-language book on algebra written by Gerolamo Cardano. It was first published in 1545 under the title Artis Magnae, Sive de Regulis Algebraicis Liber Unus (Book number one about The Great Art, or The Rules of Algebra). There was a second edition in Cardano's lifetime, published in 1570. It is considered one of the three greatest scientific treatises of the early Renaissance, together with Copernicus' De revolutionibus orbium coelestium and Vesalius' De humani corporis fabrica. The first editions of these three books were published within a two-year span (1543–1545).

History
In 1535 Niccolò Fontana Tartaglia became famous for having solved cubics of the form x3 + ax = b (with a,b > 0). However, he chose to keep his method secret. In 1539, Cardano, then a lecturer in mathematics at the Piatti Foundation in Milan, published his first mathematical book, Pratica Arithmeticæ et mensurandi singularis (The Practice of Arithmetic and Simple Mensuration). That same year, he asked Tartaglia to explain to him his method for solving cubic equations. After some reluctance, Tartaglia did so, but he asked Cardano not to share the information until he published it. Cardano submerged himself in mathematics during the next several years working on how to extend Tartaglia's formula to other types of cubics. Furthermore, his student Lodovico Ferrari found a way of solving quartic equations, but Ferrari's method depended upon Tartaglia's, since it involved the use of an auxiliary cubic equation. Then Cardano became aware of the fact that Scipione del Ferro had discovered Tartaglia's formula before Tartaglia himself, a discovery that prompted him to publish these results.

Contents
The book, which is divided into forty chapters, contains the first published algebraic solution to cubic and quartic equations. Cardano acknowledges that Tartaglia gave him the formula for solving a type of cubic equations and that the same formula had been discovered by Scipione del Ferro. He also acknowledges that it was Ferrari who found a way of solving quartic equations.

Since at the time negative numbers were not generally acknowledged, knowing how to solve cubics of the form x3 + ax = b did not mean knowing how to solve cubics of the form x3 = ax + b (with a,b > 0), for instance. Besides, Cardano also explains how to reduce equations of the form x3 + ax2 + bx + c = 0 to cubic equations without a quadratic term, but, again, he has to consider several cases. In all, Cardano was driven to the study of thirteen different types of cubic equations (chapters XI–XXIII).

In Ars Magna the concept of multiple root appears for the first time (chapter I). The first example that Cardano provides of a polynomial equation with multiple roots is x3 = 12x + 16, of which −2 is a double root.

Ars Magna also contains the first occurrence of complex numbers (chapter XXXVII). The problem mentioned by Cardano which leads to square roots of negative numbers is: find two numbers whose sum is equal to 10 and whose product is equal to 40. The answer is 5 + √−15 and 5 − √−15. Cardano called this "sophistic," because he saw no physical meaning to it, but boldly wrote "nevertheless we will operate" and formally calculated that their product does indeed equal 40. Cardano then says that this answer is "as subtle as it is useless".

It is a common misconception that Cardano introduced complex numbers in solving cubic equations. Since (in modern notation) Cardano's formula for a root of the polynomial x3 + px + q  is

square roots of negative numbers appear naturally in this context. However, q2/4 + p3/27 never happens to be negative in the specific cases in which Cardano applies the formula.

Notes

Bibliography

External links
.pdf of Ars Magna (in Latin)
Cardano's biography

Mathematics books
History of mathematics
1545 books
1545 in science
16th-century Latin books